Melaleuca ringens is a plant in the myrtle family, Myrtaceae, and is endemic to the south-west of Western Australia. It shares some features with Melaleuca diosmifolia but has creamy yellow flower spikes (rather than yellow-green) and a lower, more spreading form.

Description

The flowers are creamy-yellow coloured, arranged in spikes on the ends of branches which continue to grow after flowering or sometimes between the leaves. This species flowers prolifically but like those of some other melaleucas, the flowers have a sickly-sweet smell. The stamens are arranged in five bundles around the flower, each bundle containing 7 to 11 stamens.

Taxonomy and naming
Melaleuca ringens was first formally described in 1992 by Frances Quinn, Kirsten Cowley, Lyndley Craven and Bryan Barlow in Nuytsia. The specific epithet (ringens) is from the Latin ringens meaning "gaping" in reference to the wide opening of the fruit.

Distribution and habitat
This melaleuca is confined to the D'Entrecasteaux National Park in the Warren biogeographic region growing in dense heath in sand over limestone.

Conservation
Melaleuca ringens is classified as "Priority Three" by the Government of Western Australia Department of Parks and Wildlife, meaning that it is known from only a few locations and is not currently in imminent danger.

Use in horticulture
Melaleuca ringens is sometimes marketed as a dwarf form of Melaleuca diosmifolia.

References

ringens
Myrtales of Australia
Plants described in 1992
Endemic flora of Western Australia